The term Samaná or Samana may mean several things:

Places

Dominican Republic
Samaná Province, a province in the Dominican Republic
Samaná (town), or Santa Bárbara de Samaná, the capital of Samaná Province
Samaná Peninsula
Samaná Bay, a body of water in the Atlantic next to the Samaná Peninsula
Samaná El Catey International Airport

Other
Samana Cay, a uninhabited 
Samaná, Caldas, a town and municipality in the Colombian Department of Caldas
Samaná Norte River, a river in Antioquia Department, Colombia
Samana, India, a town in Patiala district in the Indian state of Punja
Samana Range, a mountain range in Pakistan near Peshawar
Samana, Guinea

People
Samana, or śramaṇa, the name for certain wandering ascetics from the Indian subcontinent, one of whom was Gautama Buddha
Samana, the mother of Imam Ali al-Hadi
Natthaphong Samana (born 1984), Thai footballer

Other
Samaná Americans, a community of descendants of 19th century U.S. freed people of color in the Dominican Republic
Samaná English, spoken by the Samaná Americans
Samana (moth), a genus of moths in the family Geometridae
Samana hutia, an extinct species of rodent in the family Capromyidae